Maly Amalat (Baga Amalat) is a rural locality (a settlement) in Bauntovsky District, Republic of Buryatia, Russia. The population was 122 as of 2010. There are 5 streets.

Geography 
Maly Amalat is located 21 km southwest of Bagdarin (the district's administrative centre) by road, on the left bank of the Maly Amalat river, a tributary of the Amalat.

References 

Rural localities in Bauntovsky District